Cam Ly may refer to:

 Cẩm Ly (born 1970),  a Vietnamese singer
 Cẩm Lý, a commune in Vietnam